Ratna Ghoshal is an Indian film and television actress. She began her career as a supporting actress. She set foot in the world of acting through the film Raja Rammohun.

Career
Raja Rammohun directed by Bijoy Bose in 1965 was her debut film. Before starring in the lead roles, she acted in the supporting roles for 1967 films Devi Tirtha Kamrup Kamakhya and Kedar Raja. She played her first lead role in the film Panna Hire Chunni in 1969. She is also active in performing at Bengali theatres and has worked with Soumitra Chatterjee and others.

Filmography

Web series
Labannya in Holy Faak (2015-2017) on Hoichoi

Television

Awards

References

External links 
 

Living people
Bengali television actresses
Year of birth missing (living people)
Indian film actresses
20th-century Indian actresses
21st-century Indian actresses